Kłębanowice may refer to the following places in Poland:
Kłębanowice, Legnica County in Gmina Legnickie Pole, Legnica County in Lower Silesian Voivodeship, (SW Poland)
Kłębanowice, Polkowice County in Gmina Radwanice, Polkowice County in Lower Silesian Voivodeship (SW Poland)